The Franciscan Monastery of the Holy Land in America is a Franciscan complex at 14th and Quincy Streets in the Brookland neighborhood of Northeast Washington, D.C.  Located on a hill called Mount Saint Sepulcher, and anchored by the Memorial Church of the Holy Sepulcher, it includes gardens, replicas of various shrines throughout Israel, a replica of the catacombs in Rome, an archive, a library, as well as bones of Saint Benignus of Armagh, brought from the Roman catacombs and originally in the cathedral of Narni, Italy.

History 
The Very Reverend Charles A. Vassani (1831–1896) established the  U.S. Commissariat of the Holy Land in 1880, in New York City. It was from this location that Rev. Vassani and Father Godfrey Schilling, O.F.M. (1855-1934) began to plan to build a "Holy Land in America" and a Holy Sepulcher.   They envisioned building on a high hill on Staten Island, overlooking the entrance to New York's harbor. These plans were later dropped.  Eventually the plans changed to a wooded hilltop in Brookland, Washington, D.C. In 1897, Fr. Godfrey purchased the McCeeney Estate in Brookland in order to found a monastery and church.

The six Brothers lived in the abandoned McCeeney house. After purchasing the site, Fr. Schilling visited the Holy Land and took measurements and photographs of the Holy Sites. In February 1898, ground was broken, and the cornerstone was laid on the Feast of St. Joseph.

Construction of the holy shrines, gardens, and Rosary Portico continued for several years.   The Church was consecrated in September 1924, on the twenty-fifth anniversary of its dedication.

In January 1992, the "Franciscan Monastery and Memorial Church of the Holy Land" was listed on the National Register of Historic Places.

In 2022, the Archdiocese set the site as the sole designated location for Sunday celebration the Tridentine Mass within the city of Washington.

Architecture 

The Memorial Church of the Holy Sepulcher was designed by the architect Aristide Leonori.  The cornerstone was laid in 1898 and construction completed in 1899. 
The church's design alludes to the Church of the Holy Sepulchre in Jerusalem. Its floor plan loosely resembles the fivefold Jerusalem cross.  It was also built in the neo-Byzantine style, resembling Hagia Sophia in Constantinople. Some Romanesque influences were added to the design.

The Rosary Portico designed by John Joseph Earley surrounds the church.  It contains fifteen chapels depicting the mysteries of the Rosary. Each chapel contains plaques bearing the Hail Mary in nearly two hundred ancient and modern languages. The Rosary Portico resembles the Cloister of St. John Lateran in Rome and Saint Paul's Outside the Walls. Various Christian symbols from the catacombs decorate the facade.

Attached to the Church is the neo-Romanesque Monastery. The Monastery grounds contain replicas of shrines in the Holy Land, a Lourdes grotto, and a replica of the Porziuncola.

Many artists and architects have contributed to the development of the site.

Library and Archives 
The Library and Archives contain various materials on the Holy Land and the early development of the monastery, monastery life and a large collection of vestments.

Music

Organ 

A Lively-Fulcher organ was installed in 2003 which replaced the Henry Pilcher Sons Opus 1481. There are monthly recitals.

Notes

References

External links

Franciscan Monastery official home page

19th-century Christian monasteries
Brookland (Washington, D.C.)
Franciscan monasteries in the United States
Gardens in Washington, D.C.
Libraries in Washington, D.C.
Byzantine Revival architecture in Washington, D.C.
Properties of religious function on the National Register of Historic Places in Washington, D.C.
Roman Catholic churches completed in 1899
Roman Catholic Archdiocese of Washington
Roman Catholic churches in Washington, D.C.
Romanesque Revival church buildings in Washington, D.C.
19th-century Roman Catholic church buildings in the United States